Señor Blues is a 1997 studio album by the blues musician Taj Mahal. It contains a cover of James Brown's "Think". It won the Grammy Award for Best Contemporary Blues Album at the 40th Grammy Awards.

Track listing
 "Queen Bee" (Taj Mahal)
 "Think" (Lowman Pauling)
 "Irresistible You" (Al Kasha, Luther Dixon)
 "Having a Real Bad Day" (Delbert McClinton, John Barlow Jarvis)
 "Señor Blues" (Horace Silver)
 "Sophisticated Mama" (Washboard Sam)
 "Oh Lord, Things Are Gettin' Crazy Up in Here" (Jon Cleary)
 "I Miss You Baby" (Freddie Simon)
 "You Rascal You" (Sam Theard)
 "Mind Your Own Business" (Hank Williams)
 "21st Century Gypsy Singing Lover Man" (Taj Mahal, Jon Cleary)
 "At Last (I Found a Love)" (Marvin Gaye, Anna Gordy Gaye, Elgie Stover)
 "Mr. Pitiful" (Steve Cropper, Otis Redding)

Personnel
Taj Mahal – Vocals, harmonica, dobro, kazoo
Johnny Lee Schell – guitar
Jon Cleary – piano, Wurlitzer piano
Mick Weaver – Hammond B-3 organ
Larry Fulcher – bass
Tony Braunagel – drums, percussion, tambourine
Sir Harry Bowens, Donna Taylor, Terrence Forsythe – background vocals
The Texacalli Horns: 
Darrell Leonard – trumpet, trombone, French Horn
Joe Sublett – tenor saxophone

References

1997 albums
Taj Mahal (musician) albums
Albums produced by John Porter (musician)
Private Music albums
Grammy Award for Best Contemporary Blues Album